The Preah Norodom Sihanouk-Angkor Museum (Khmer: សារៈមន្ទីរ​ព្រះនរោត្តម សីហនុ-អង្គរ) is a museum located in Siem Reap, Cambodia. The museum is dedicated to displaying exhibits on the history of Cambodia's civilization through various cultural and archaeological artifacts.

History 
The construction of the museum was financed by AEON, the APSARA Authority and the Sophia University. One of the reasons this museum was built was to preserve artifacts from excavations. On November 2, 2007, the museum was inaugurated.  As of 2016, the renovation work of the building structure begins, the renovation work is mainly intended for the repair of the museum's roof, by the end of March 2017, the renovation work was completed.

Collections 
The museum has a collection of statues and archaeological remains. The museum is dedicated to preserving the cultural heritage of Cambodia, among one of these collections is pottery and ancient art of the country. This museum contains an exhibition of ceramics dating from the 15th to the 19th century. Much of the museum's statues come from the Banteay Kdei Temple excavation. Among the sculptures that stand out are the statues of Buddha, the museum has collections on the religious heritage of Cambodia. The museum contains archaeological remains such as skulls date back to the Bronze Age. The sculptures date from three important periods in Cambodia's history including the Angkor period, the Baphuon period and the Bayon period. The museum also contains a collection of crockery.

References 

Museums in Cambodia
Museums in Siem Reap

External links 
Preah Norodom Sihanouk-Angkor Museum